The 2022 NCAA Division I Field Hockey Championship was the 42nd annual tournament organized by the NCAA, to determine the national champion of Division I women's college field hockey in the United States. 

The semi-finals and championship match will be played at the Sherman Complex at the University of Connecticut in Storrs, Connecticut on November 18 and 20, 2022.

Lehigh made their debut appearance in the national championship tournament.

Qualified teams

Automatic qualifiers

At-large qualifiers

Bracket

See also 
NCAA Division II Field Hockey Championship
NCAA Division III Field Hockey Championship

References 

NCAA Division I Field Hockey Championship
NCAA Division I Field Hockey Championship
NCAA Division I Field Hockey Championship
NCAA Division I Field Hockey Championship